The qathet Regional District (qRD) is a regional district in the Canadian province of British Columbia. Its only incorporated municipality is the City of Powell River, although it includes a number of unincorporated areas. The district was formerly known as the Powell River Regional District.

Geography 
The district is bounded by the mainland portion of the Strathcona Regional District to the north, and to the east by the Squamish-Lillooet and Sunshine Coast Regional Districts. On the mainland, this includes the area southeast of Powell River to the ferry terminal at Saltery Bay and northwest of Powell River to Desolation Sound and the terminus of Highway 101 in Lund. Lasqueti Island and Texada Island, along with the southernmost Discovery Islands (including Hernando and Savary), are included, as are the largely uninhabited lands to the north and west of this area.

Government 
Its head offices are located in Powell River. The district is governed by a board of seven directors: five electoral area directors who are elected for a four-year term by voters in the electoral areas, and two municipal directors who are first elected to the City of Powell River’s council and then appointed by council to the regional board. The board chair is elected annually by all directors.

Demographics 
As of the 2006 census, 19,599 people lived in the district.

Notes

References
Community Profile: Powell River Regional District, British Columbia; Statistics Canada

External links

 

 
Regional districts of British Columbia
South Coast of British Columbia